Sir Dayendranath Burrenchobay, KBE, CMG, CVO, GCSK, (24 March 1919 – 29 March 1999) was born in Plaine Magnien, Mauritius and served as the fourth governor-general of Mauritius.

Early life and education
Dayendranath Burrenchobay grew up in Cemetery Road, Plaine Magnien. He travelled to London, England to further his education. Later he graduated from Imperial College, London.

Career

After graduating from Imperial College, London he worked for the British Electricity Authority. On his return to Mauritius he joined the Civil Service as a teacher. He eventually became Permanent Secretary at Ministry of Education & Cultural Affairs (1964-1967). This was followed by his appointment at Permanent Secretary at the Prime Minister's Office (1967-1976). He also was Chairman of the Central Electricity Board (Mauritius) (CEB) (1968-1976). He became Head of the Civil Service and in 1976 he was knighted. Over the same period he was Secretary of the Mahatma Gandhi Institute (MGI).

Legacy

On 17 May 1984, the Sir Dayendranath Burrenchobay Foundation Act was enacted in Parliament with the objectives of promoting and encouraging research in all fields and to reward and financially assist works of importance to the economic, social and cultural development of Mauritius.

Appointment as Governor-General

Dayendranath Burrenchobay was appointed by Queen Elizabeth II to hold the office of Governor-General after Henry Garrioch's retirement. Thus Burrenchobay became the third Mauritian to hold the position of Governor-General of Mauritius following previous Mauritians Sir Michel Rivalland (1968), Sir Raman Osman (1973-1977) and Sir Henry Garrioch (1977-1978). During his term as Governor General from 1978 to 1983 he oversaw two governments, first under Prime Minister Seewoosagur Ramgoolam and then when Sir Anerood Jugnauth became Prime Minister. Burrenchobay was succeeded by Seewoosagur Ramgoolam himself.

Publications

In 2000 Dayendranath Burrenchobay's book "Let the People Think: A Compilation of the Thoughts of Sir Dayendranath Burrenchobay" was published by Editions de l'Ocean Indien.

References 

Governors-General of Mauritius
1919 births
1999 deaths
Alumni of Imperial College London
Alumni of the UCL Institute of Education
Companions of the Order of St Michael and St George
Commanders of the Royal Victorian Order
Knights Commander of the Order of the British Empire
Mauritian Knights Bachelor
Mauritian Hindus
Mauritian politicians of Indian descent
People from Grand Port District
Mauritian scientists
Mauritian expatriates in the United Kingdom